Cicadmalleus is a genus of cicadas in the family Cicadidae, found in Indomalaya (Thailand). There is at least one described species in Cicadmalleus, C. micheli.

Cicadmalleus is the only genus of the tribe Cicadmalleuini.

References

Further reading

 
 
 
 
 
 
 
 
 

Cicadinae
Cicadidae genera